Blagaja (Serbian Cyrillic: Благаја) is a mountain in central Serbia, near the town of Požega.

References

Mountains of Serbia